Paul Ellering (born August 22, 1953) is an American professional wrestling manager and former professional wrestler. He is currently signed with WWE to a legends contract. Ellering spent most of his wrestling career managing the Road Warriors (Animal and Hawk), working with them from 1983 to 1990 and again on occasion between 1992 and 1997. In addition to being their on screen manager he actually handled the team's affairs outside the ring as well, including contract negotiations and travel arrangements. Ellering and the Road Warriors were inducted into both the Professional Wrestling Hall of Fame and the WWE Hall of Fame in 2011. Five years later, in June 2016, he returned to the ring at NXT TakeOver: The End as the manager of The Authors of Pain, a heel tag team making their debut. Ellering has been labeled as one of the greatest wrestling managers of all time.

Prior to becoming a manager he was a professional wrestler, but due to injuries retired in 1983 to become a full-time manager, only wrestling on special occasions. In the late 1990s he was involved in a storyline where he actually turned on the Road Warriors and managed Disciples of Apocalypse as they fought the Road Warriors. After retiring from full-time activity in wrestling, he raced in the Iditarod and John Beargrease Dog Sled Race.

Early life

Professional wrestling career

Early career
Ellering was trained in Minneapolis, Minnesota at a camp run by American Wrestling Association (AWA) owner and promoter Verne Gagne and wrestler/trainer Eddie Sharkey in the mid-1970s. According to Ellering's RF Video shoot interview, of the thirty-plus trainees in the camp, only himself and later AWA mid-card wrestler Steve Olsonoski (a.k.a. Steve O) made it through the camp. Ellering would later go on to wrestle in singles and tag teams for Gagne in the AWA, Bill Watts's Mid-South promotion, and for Jerry Jarrett's Memphis promotion, where he was paired with manager Jimmy Hart. Ellering now known as "Precious" Paul Ellering His notable feuds were with Jesse Ventura as a face, and as a heel with Jerry Lawler and Jimmy Valiant, from whom he won the AWA Southern Heavyweight Championship.

Mid-South Wrestling
While wrestling for Mid-South Wrestling, Ellering in 1982 severely injured his knee in a match with Robert Gibson,  started doing workout segments with kids for Mid South re-injuring it after returning to the ring, but the injury ended his full-time wrestling career.

Georgia and AWA

Georgia booker Ole Anderson recognized his speaking ability, however, and gave him a job as a manager.
Ellering formed a stable named the Legion of Doom including such wrestlers as King Kong Bundy, Jake Roberts and The Road Warriors.  This was later reduced down to just the Warriors who held the NWA National Tag Team Championship three times before moving to the American Wrestling Association where they held the AWA World Tag Team Championship for a year, during which time the Warriors – and Ellering by association – turned fan favorite.

Ellering is best known for managing the Warriors, from 1983 until 1992 during their stints in the AWA, various National Wrestling Alliance territories, New Japan Pro-Wrestling, All-Japan Pro Wrestling, and the World Wrestling Federation in 1992. Ellering was also the real-life manager for the team; he booked their matches, lined up their flights, set up hotel reservations, and kept track of their expenses.

Jim Crockett Promotions/World Championship Wrestling (1986–1990)
Following the loss of the AWA tag title, Ellering and the Warriors headed to Jim Crockett Promotions where their accomplishments included the Crockett Cup (1986) and the WCW World Tag Team Championship in 1988 (the team and manager briefly turning villains to achieve the latter.) Although primarily a manager, Ellering stepped between the ropes as a competitor, notably at the 1987 NWA Great American Bash in which he joined the Road Warriors, Nikita Koloff, and Dusty Rhodes to face The Four Horsemen and their manager J. J. Dillon in the first ever WarGames match. Ellering would also face Teddy Long in a 'Hair vs. Hair' match at the World Championship Wrestling Capital Combat event in 1990, coming away with a victory.

World Wrestling Federation (1992; 1998–1999)
Ellering returned as the manager of Hawk and Animal (by now using The Legion Of Doom as their actual team name) at Wrestlemania VIII and stayed with them until they left the WWF after SummerSlam (1992).  During a promotional angle where Hawk and Animal "rediscovered" their childhood toy "Rocko", a ventriloquist's dummy, Ellering was the puppeteer and voice of the dummy.

Throughout 1998 he managed the Disciples of Apocalypse, who were then feuding with the Legion of Doom; according to Ellering and Animal on the Road Warriors DVD, Ellering had a hard time working with another team against Hawk and Animal, and had difficulty ripping on his former team on the microphone. By the end of his second WWF run, though, he was back to managing the LOD, most notably on Sunday Night Heat, during a tag-team battle royal for a shot at the tag titles later in the night at WrestleMania XV, though they were unsuccessful.

Return to WWE (2011–present)
In 2011, Ellering was inducted into the WWE Hall of Fame, along with the Road Warriors, by "The American Dream" Dusty Rhodes.

Ellering made his return to WWE programming at NXT TakeOver: The End on June 8, 2016, revealing himself as the manager of a debuting Authors of Pain (Akam and Rezar), after their attack on American Alpha, turning Ellering heel for the first time in 18 years. On January 28, 2017, at NXT TakeOver: San Antonio, Ellering led Akam and Rezar to their first reign as NXT Tag Team Champions. On April 9, 2018, Paul Ellering made his debut on Monday Night Raw with Akam and Rezar as they answered an open challenge from Heath Slater and Rhyno.  After they were victorious in their match, Akam and Rezar ended their partnership with Ellering by pushing him away and leaving him ringside as they returned backstage.

Personal life

After retiring from professional wrestling, he traveled to Alaska to become a sled dog racer, participating in the Iditarod. In 2000 he came in 54th place.

In 2002, Ellering became the owner and operator of the Historic Rock Tavern on Big Birch Lake in Grey Eagle, Minnesota. In 2020, it was sold to new ownership after being on the market for three years. He has three children: Rebecca, Rachael and Saul. His daughter Rachael won the bronze medal at the 2014 World Powerlifting Championships. She made her professional wrestling debut in December 2015.

Other media
Ellering made his video game debut as a non-playable character in WWE 2K18.

Championships and accomplishments
Cauliflower Alley Club
Tag Team Award (2020) – as part of The Road Warriors
Continental Wrestling Association
AWA Southern Heavyweight Championship (1 time)
AWA Southern Tag Team Championship (1 time) – with Sheik Ali Hassan
International Wrestling Enterprise (Japan)
IWA Tag Team Championship (1 time) – with Terry Latham
National Wrestling Alliance
NWA Legends Hall of Heroes (2016)
Professional Wrestling Hall of Fame and Museum
Class of 2011 (As a member of The Road Warriors)
Pro Wrestling Illustrated
PWI Manager of the Year (1984)
WWE
WWE Hall of Fame (Class of 2011) – as a member of The Road Warriors

References

External links

 
 Ellering at Internet Movie Database
 Ellering at Cabela's Iditarod website
 

1953 births
American dog mushers
American male professional wrestlers
American male weightlifters
Living people
People from Melrose, Minnesota
Professional wrestlers from Minnesota
Professional Wrestling Hall of Fame and Museum
Professional wrestling managers and valets
The Road Warriors members
WWE Hall of Fame inductees